Microblepsis rectilinea is a moth in the family Drepanidae. It was described by Watson in 1968. It is found in Sichuan, China.

The length of the forewings is 12-13.5 mm for males and 12–14 mm for females. The ground colour of both wings is grey brown with very pale brown markings.

References

Moths described in 1968
Drepaninae